Ministry of Supply is a Boston-based business wear men's and women's fashion brand launched in 2012 and founded by former Massachusetts Institute of Technology students using some of the same temperature regulating material as NASA astronauts in their clothing.

The company currently sells the majority of their clothing online and currently has brick and mortar retail locations in Washington D.C.,  San Francisco,  New York, Santa Monica, Boston, and Chicago.

History
The company is named after the Ministry of Supply, a British government department that was formed in 1939 to coordinate the supply of equipment to all three branches of the armed forces during World War II. After a year of product development and small-scale sales in the spring of 2012, the company decided to conduct a Kickstarter campaign to fund the creation of a synthetic knit-blend dress shirt with heat and moisture management, odor control, and offered a full range of motion.  The campaign raised over $400,000.

In June 2013, the company again went to Kickstarter for a campaign to raise funds to produce a dress sock. This campaign raised more than $200,000 for the start up company.

In late September 2013, the company raised $1.1 million in seed round financing from VegasTechFund, SK Ventures, and Red Sox pitcher Craig Breslow. The $50,000 investment from Breslow came after his fiancée bought one of the shirts as a birthday present and he wore the shirt while traveling on the road with the team.

Design
The Ministry of Supply's goal is to use new materials, aerospace, robotic engineering, and thermal analysis to create a new category in the design of better-fitting men's business attire.
The company seeks limited beta testing through customer input and feedback with when designing their clothing. Early customers are integrated into the development and design process by inviting them to be part of the research into the final product.

References

2012 establishments in Massachusetts
Clothing brands of the United States
2010s fashion